Harrison John Osterfield (born 4 July 1996) is a British actor and model. He first gained prominence through his supporting role as Snowden in the miniseries Catch-22 (2019). He then starred as Leopold in the Netflix series The Irregulars (2021).

Early life and education
Osterfield was born in Surrey, United Kingdom and raised near West Sussex with his younger sister, Charlotte. From 2008 to 2014, he attended Caterham School as a boarding student, participating in the drama club and starring in school plays. This inspired him to pursue acting, and he subsequently enrolled in the BRIT School, where he met and became close friends with Tom Holland. He was then accepted into the foundation course at the London Academy of Music and Dramatic Art.

Career
When Holland was cast as Spider-Man in the Marvel Cinematic Universe, Osterfield was brought on to be his personal assistant on two movies, and made minor cameos in the films which starred Holland.

In June 2018, it was announced that he had been cast in a minor role on the 2019 Hulu adaptation of Catch-22 directed by George Clooney. Also in 2019, he created a comedy podcast called Village People with his friend Greg Birks. They voice the characters Simon and Mark, who interview the residents of their fictional English hometown.

In October 2019, he was cast in his first lead role in the 2021 Netflix series The Irregulars. The series premiered in March 2021 and was cancelled in May of that year.

Filmography

Film

Television

References

External links

Living people
1996 births
21st-century English male actors
English male film actors
English male television actors
English male voice actors
Male actors from Surrey
People educated at Caterham School
People educated at the BRIT School